The 1995 Doc Martens European League was a  professional non-ranking snooker tournament that was played from 28 December 1994 to 7 May 1995. All matches including the play-offs were played at the Diamond Centre at Irthlingborough.

Stephen Hendry won in the final 10–2 against Ken Doherty. 


League phase

 28 December Match Day 1
 Alan McManus 5–3 Ken Doherty
 Steve Davis 6–2 Jimmy White
 29 December Match Day 2
 Steve Davis 5–3 Alan McManus
 Ken Doherty 7–1 Ronnie O'Sullivan
 John Parrott 5–3 Jimmy White
 21 January Match Day 3
 Jimmy White 5–3 Ken Doherty
 Stephen Hendry 4–4 Alan McManus
 Steve Davis 5–3 Ronnie O'Sullivan
 22 January Match Day 4
 John Parrott 4–4 Alan McManus
 Stephen Hendry 7–1 Ronnie O'Sullivan
 26 February Match Day 5
 Ronnie O'Sullivan 4–4 John Parrott
 Jimmy White 5–3 Alan McManus
 Stephen Hendry 6–2 Steve Davis
 27 February Match Day 6
 Ronnie O'Sullivan 5–3 Alan McManus
 Stephen Hendry 5–3 Ken Doherty
 Steve Davis 5–3 John Parrott
 4 March Match Day 7
 Stephen Hendry 5–3 John Parrott
 Ken Doherty 4–4 Steve Davis* 
 5 March Match Day 8
 Ken Doherty 6–2 John Parrott
 Stephen Hendry 6–2 Jimmy White
 6 March Match Day 9
 Ronnie O'Sullivan 4–4 Jimmy White

Play-offs 
6–7 May (Diamond Centre, Irthlingborough, England)

References

Premier League Snooker
1995 in snooker
1995 in British sport